Reuben Muoka is a former Communication Editor of Vanguard Newspaper, an ex-deputy general manager of Nigeria First Mobile Telephone Operator (MTS First Wireless) and currently the director of public affairs of Nigerian Communications Commission.

Education 
Muoka obtained his first degree in Performing Arts from University of Ilorin. He moved to University of Lagos for his master's degree in Mass Communication where he specialises in  Public Relations and Advertising.

Career in NCC 
Muoka became part of the  Nigerian Communication Commission in 2007 as a Principal Manager and was assigned to a Public Affairs Department where he was the head of  Media and Public Relations Unit. In 2010, he became as assistant director  and in 2015, he became a deputy director assigned to head the re-engineered Public Relations Unit of PAD. In 2017, he was moved to the department of  Policy, Competition and Economic Analysis in order to head the Economic Analysis unit of department. In 2021,  he was appointed as the head of the Special Duties Department, which includes the International Relations Unit; Emergency Communication Centres Unit; the Public-Private Partnership Unit; and the Security Services Unit of the commission.

Memberships 
Muoka is a member of the following communication bodies; Nigeria Union of Journalists, Nigeria Institute of Public Relations and  Associate Member of the Registered Practitioners of Advertising.

References 

Living people
Nigerian journalists
Year of birth missing (living people)